Hinwil District is one of the twelve districts of the German-speaking canton of Zurich, Switzerland. It lies to the southeast of the canton, bordering the adjacent St. Gallen.

It was formed in 1831, when the administrative seat was moved to Hinwil from Grüningen. The district was known as Oberamt Grüningen from 1815–1831, which continued the historical bailiwick of Grüningen (1408–1798).

Municipalities 
Hinwil contains a total of eleven municipalities:

See also 
Municipalities of the canton of Zürich

References

Districts of the canton of Zürich